International Conference of Young Scientist or ICYS is the unofficial world championship of research papers in several scientific disciplines for secondary school students. It has gained notable participation across three continents (Europe, Asia, and America). It is organised by a host institution and vary for each year. ICYS is a member of  World Federation of Physics Competitions.

History

In 1993 the representatives of Eotvos Lorand University, Budapest and the State University of Belarus, Minsk decided to organize together a conference for 14- to 18-year-old secondary school students. The aim of the organizers with organizing such a new type of a competition was to acquaint secondary school students with the methods of scientific research. This includes different phases of research work from the very beginning the pointing out the topic to the last step, summing up the results of the research in a foreign language-lecture. The conference gives the challenging opportunity to the young scientists to get some feedback of the work with which they are just trying to deal, and to measure their strength in an international field.
Over the years, students from the following countries have participated in the Conference: Belarus, Czech Republic, Finland, Georgia, Germany, Greece, Hungary, India, North Macedonia, Poland, Romania, Russia, Singapore, Slovakia, The Netherlands, Ukraine, United States of America, and Yugoslavia.
The conference was held in Hungary (Visegrad, 1994, 1996, 1998), in Belarus (Baranovichi, 1995, 1997, 1999), in 2000 in the Netherlands (Nijmegen), in 2001 in Poland (Katowice), in 2002 in Georgia (Kutaisi), and in 2003 in Czech Republic (Prague).
The first ICYS was in Visegrad in 1994. Iran was observer in 2010. Then 70 lectures were presented by students from 5 countries. Hungarian organizers always come back to Visegrad, the competition become widely known as "Visegrad Conference".
In 1996 the number of participants increased, 86 lecturers from 9 countries gave their lectures. The Conference every year becomes richer, new countries join to the competition. The Conference has a good reputation not only in the Middle European countries, but outside Europe too. This year we have an observer from Singapore, a country where the education receives from the government the highest financial support all over the world. This year we have more than 80 secondary school participants, and more than 70 lectures with wide variety of topics. We are convinced, that nowadays, during the permanently decreasing popularity of sciences a scientific event which attracts the young generation has special significance. Perhaps most of the participating students will later become students at various universities and will be researchers reporting at scientific conferences. This first appearance may be a decisive factor in their future scientific career.
It celebrated its 20th year in Bali, Indonesia. Later, a young scientist (Amin Ehsanian) suggested the new formation of the conference for 2014. The 2014 edition were supposed to be held in Ukraine but due to the Ukraine crisis, it were transferred to Serbia.

Conference
1994 Visegrád, Hungary
1995 Baranovichi, Belarus
1996 Visegrád, Hungary
1997 Baranovichi, Belarus
1998 Visegrád, Hungary
1999 Baranovichi, Belarus
2000 Nijmegen, Netherlands - first time the conference were held outside of Hungary and Belarus, hosted by Radboud University Nijmegen
2001 Katowice, Poland - hosted by Youth Palace Katowice
2002 Kutaisi, Georgia
2003 Prague and Kladno, Czech Republic
2004 Nijmegen, Netherlands - hosted by Radboud University Nijmegen
2005 Katowice, Poland - hosted by Youth Palace Katowice
2006 Stuttgart, Germany - sponsored by Bosch, hosted by Heidehof Foundation
2007 Saint-Petersburg, Russia - hosted by Saint Petersburg State University
2008 Chernivtsi, Ukraine - hosted by Chernivtsi University and Youth Scientific Society Quasar
2009 Pszczyna, Poland - hosted by Boleslaw Chrobry I Comprehensive Secondary School
2010 Bali, Indonesia - first time the conference is hosted outside Europe, hosted by Surya Institute
2011 Moscow, Russia - the first country to have two different cities as host, hosted by Moscow State University, Dynasty Foundation and Metallinvestbank
2012 Nijmegen, Netherlands - hosted by Radboud University Nijmegen
2013 Bali, Indonesia - 20th edition, hosted by Surya Institute and Surya University
2014 Belgrade, Serbia - hosted by Regional Centre for Talents Belgrade Two
2015 İzmir, Turkey - hosted by İzmir University
2016 Cluj-Napoca, Romania - hosted by Babeş-Bolyai University
2017 Stuttgart, Germany - hosted by Student Research Centers Baden-Württemberg
2018 Belgrade, Serbia - hosted by Regional Centre for Talents Belgrade Two
2019 Kuala Lumpur, Malaysia - hosted by Malaysia Young Scientists Organisation

Participating countries
 Blue indicate Participate.
 Orange indicate Observer.
 Grey indicate Not participate.
 White indicate No information.

Only Belarus, Hungary and Ukraine have made it to all Conferences. Netherlands and Russia, each missed a Conference.

See also
 Science fair

References

External links
  Official ICYS website
 2016 ICYS
 2015 ICYS
 2014 ICYS
 2013 ICYS , 20th Edition
  2012 ICYS
  2011 ICYS

Science competitions
Youth science